This article lists political parties in Croatia.

Croatia has a multi-party system with numerous parties that must collaborate to form coalition governments; a party rarely has a chance of gaining power alone. Between January 1990 (when political parties were legalized in Croatia) and May 2022, 391 political parties were registered, out of which 224 have since been struck from the register.

Modern parties

Political parties with elected representation at the national level

Political parties with previously elected representation at a national level

 Alliance of Primorje-Gorski Kotar (Primorsko-goranski savez or PGS) – won 1 seat in 1992 (then called Rijeka Democratic Union or RiDS) – won 1 seat in 1995; 2 seats in 2000; 1 seat in 2003 
 Croatian Christian Democratic Union (Hrvatska kršćanska demokratska unija or HKDU) – won 1 seat in 1995, 1 seat in 2000
 Croatian Civic Party (Hrvatska građanska stranka or HGS) – won 3 seats in 2011
 Croatian Democratic Peasant Party (Hrvatska demokratska seljačka stranka or HDSS) – won 1 seat in 2003
† Croatian Independent Democrats (Hrvatski nezavisni demokrati or HND) – active from 1994 to 2011; won 1 seat in 1995
 Croatian Labourists – Labour Party (Hrvatski laburisti - Stranka rada) – won 6 seats in 2011; 3 seats in 2015
 Croatian Party of Pensioners (Hrvatska stranka umirovljenika or HSU)  – won 3 seats in 2003; 1 seats in 2007; 3 seats in 2011; 2 seats in 2015; 2 seats in 2016; 1 seats in 2020
 Croatian Party of Rights (Hrvatska stranka prava or HSP) – won 5 seats in 1992; 4 seats in 1995 and 2000; 8 seats in 2003; 1 seat in 2007
† Croatian Party of Rights Dr. Ante Starčević (Hrvatska stranka prava dr. Ante Starčević or HSP AS) – won 1 seat in 2011; 3 seats in 2015
† Dalmatian Action (Dalmatinska akcija or DA) – active from 1990 to 2003; won 1 seat in 1992
† Democratic Centre (Demokratski centar or DC) – active from 2000 to 2016; won 1 seat in 2003
 Democrats (Demokrati) – active from 2018; 1 seat between 2018 and 2020
† Liberal Party (Liberalna stranka or LS) – active from 1998 to 2006; won 2 seats in 2000 and 2003
† Party of Croatian Intergenerational Solidarity (Stranka međugeneracijske solidarnosti Hrvatske or SMSH) – active from 2016 to 2017; had 1 seat in 2016 (merged into Bandić Milan 365 - Labour and Solidarity Party in November 2017)
† Party of Liberal Democrats (Stranka liberalnih demokrata or LIBRA) –  active from 2002 to 2005; won 3 seats in 2003
 † Serb People's Party (Srpska narodna stranka/Српска народна странка or SNS/CHC) – won 3 seats in 1992; 2 seats in 1995; 1 seat in 2000
† Slavonia-Baranja Croatian Party (Slavonsko-baranjska hrvatska stranka or S-BHS) – active from 1992 to 2008, won 1 seat in 1995; 1 seat in 2000
† Social Democratic Action of Croatia (Akcija socijaldemokrata Hrvatske or ASH) – active between 1994 and 2016; won 1 seat in 1995

Other parties
 Autochthonous Croatian Party of Rights (Autohtona-Hrvatska stranka prava or A-HSP)
 Bloc Pensioners Together (Blok umirovljenici zajedno or BUZ)
 Charter for Rijeka or List for Rijeka (Lista za Rijeku/Lista per Fiume; RI or LZR)
† Croatian Bloc (Hrvatski blok or HB) – active 2002–2009
 Croatian Labour Party (Hrvatska radnička stranka or HRS)
 Croatian Party of Rights 1861 (Hrvatska stranka prava 1861 or HSP 1861)
 Croatian Pure Party of Rights (Hrvatska čista stranka prava or HČSP)
 Croatian Republican Union (Hrvatska republikanska zajednica or HRZ)
 Democratic Alliance of Serbs (Demokratski savez Srba/Демократски caвeз Cpбa or DSS/ДСC)
 Democratic Party of Zagorje (Zagorska demokratska stranka or ZDS)
 For the City (Za grad or ZG)
 Green Alliance – Greens (Zeleni savez – Zeleni)
 Istrian Social Democratic Forum (Istarski socijaldemokratski forum or ISDF)
 Left of Croatia (Ljevica Hrvatske)
 Međimurje Party (Međimurska stranka)
 † Only Croatia – Movement for Croatia (Jedino Hrvatska – Pokret za Hrvatsku)
 † Party of Danube Serbs (Partija podunavskih Srba/Партија подунавских Срба or PPS/ППС)
 † Party with a First and Last Name (Stranka s imenom i prezimenom or SIP, merged with Pametno into Centre)
 † Pirate Party (Piratska stranka)
† Serb Democratic Party (Srpska demokratska stranka/Српска демократска cтранка or SDS/СДС)
 Socialist Labour Party of Croatia (Socijalistička radnička partija Hrvatske or SRP)
 † Sustainable Development of Croatia (Održivi razvoj Hrvatske or ORaH)
 † The Split Party (Splitska stranka)
 Women's Democratic Party (Demokratska stranka žena or DSŽ)
 Youth Action (Akcija mladih or AM)
 Zagorje Party (Zagorska stranka or ZS)

Historical parties

 Illyrian Party/People's Party (Ilirska stranka/Narodna stranka, 1841–1861)
 People's Liberal Party/Independent People's Party (Narodno-liberalna stranka/Neodvisna narodna stranka, 1861–1903)
 Croatian-Hungarian Party (Hrvatsko-ugarska stranka, 1841–1861)
 Unionist Party/People's Constitutional Party (Unionistička stranka/Narodno-ustavna stranka, 1861–1873)
 Party of Rights/Croatian Party of Rights (Stranka prava/Hrvatska stranka prava, 1861–1910)
 Pure Party of Rights/Croatian Pure Party of Rights (Čista stranka prava/Hrvatska čista stranka prava, 1895–1918)
 Starčević's Party of Rights (Starčevićeva stranka prava, 1908–1911–1918)
  (Napredna stranka/Hrvatska pučka napredna stranka, 1904–1910)
 Progressive Democratic Party (Napredna demokratska stranka, 1918–1919)
 Serb Independent Party/Serb People's Independent Party (Srpska samostalna stranka/Srpska narodna samostalna stranka, 1881–1918)
 Serb People's Radical Party (Srpska narodna radikalna stranka, 1903–1918)
  (Hrvatska samostalna stranka, 1910–1918)
 Social Democratic Party of Croatia and Slavonia (Socijaldemokratska stranka Hrvatske i Slavonije, 1894–1918)
 Croat-Serb Coalition (Hrvatsko-srpska koalicija, 1905–1918)
 Autonomist Party (Dalmatia) (Autonomna stranka, 1860–1918)
 People's Party/People's Croatian Party or Croatian National Party (Dalmatia) (Narodna stranka/Narodna hrvatska stranka, 1861–1905)
 Serbian Party or Serb People's Party (Dalmatia) (Srpska stranka/Srpska narodna stranka, 1879–1918)
 Croatian Party (Dalmatia) (Hrvatska stranka, 1905–1918)
 Democratic Party (Dalmatia) (Demokratska stranka, 1904–1906)
  (Istria) (Hrvatsko-slovenska narodna stranka, 1878–1918)
 Croatian Popular Party (Hrvatska pučka stranka, 1919–1929)
  (Hrvatska zajednica, 1919–1926)
 Communist Party of Croatia/League of Communists of Croatia (Komunistička partija Hrvatske/Savez komunista Hrvatske, 1937–1990)

▶ Note: The Croatian adjective "narodni/a/o" could be translated as "people's" and/or "national", similar adjective "pučki/a/o" signifies "popular" or "people's" (but not "national").

See also

 Lists of political parties
 Liberalism in Croatia
 Far-right politics in Croatia

References

Croatia

Political parties in Croatia
Political parties
Croatia